Shelbyville is a city in and the county seat of Bedford County, Tennessee, United States. The town was laid out in 1810 and incorporated in 1819. Shelbyville had a population of 20,335 residents at the 2010 census. The town is a hub of the Tennessee Walking Horse industry and has been nicknamed "The Walking Horse Capital of the World".

Geography
Shelbyville is in Middle Tennessee on a Highland Rim limestone bluff upon the banks of Duck River, which flows around the southern and eastern sides of town.

Climate

Demographics

2020 census

As of the 2020 United States census, there were 23,557 people, 7,257 households, and 5,025 families residing in the city.

2000 census
As of the census of 2000, there were 16,105 people, 6,066 households, and 4,155 families residing in the city. The population density was 1,041.3 people per square mile (402.0/km2). There were 6,550 housing units at an average density of 423.5 per square mile (163.5/km2). The racial makeup of the city was 77.14% White, 14.98% African American, 0.70% Asian, 0.35% Native American, 0.05% Pacific Islander, 5.02% from other races, and 1.78% from two or more races. Hispanics or Latinos of any race made up 14.55% of the population.

Of the 6,066 households, 31.7% had children under the age of 18 living with them, 46.0% were married couples living together, 16.6% had a female householder with no husband present, and 31.5% were non-families. A total of 26.5% of all households were made up of individuals, and 12.4% had someone living alone who was 65 years of age or older. The average household size was 2.59 and the average family size was 3.05.

In the city, the population was spread out, with 25.2% under the age of 18, 11.9% from 18 to 24, 28.9% from 25 to 44, 18.8% from 45 to 64, and 15.2% who were 65 years of age or older. The median age was 34 years. For every 100 females, there were 94.4 males. For every 100 females age 18 and over, there were 91.5 males.

The median income for a household in the city was $27,593, and the median income for a family was $30,465. Males had a median income of $23,754 versus $16,065 for females. The per capita income for the city was $11,260. About 14.4% of families and 25.2% of the population were below the poverty line, including 18.4% of those under age 18 and 22.1% of those age 65 or over.

Economy

Shelbyville is known as "The Pencil City" because of its historical importance as a center of wood-cased pencil manufacturing. It is still a site for manufacture of writing instruments. In 1982, National Pen Corporation purchased its largest competitor, U.S. Pencil and Stationery Company. Sanford Corporation produces the Sharpie, the world's top-selling writing instrument, in the city.

Other major business operations in Shelbyville include manufacturers Calsonic Kansei, Newell Rubbermaid, Cebal America, and Jostens; it is also home to a Tyson Foods facility and a distribution center for Wal-Mart, as well as several nationwide trucking businesses.

Transportation
Shelbyville is at the intersection of U.S. Route 231 and U.S. Route 41A. It was the terminus of a branch line (from Wartrace), located along what is now known as Railroad Avenue, connecting with what was once known as the Saint Louis, Nashville and Chattanooga Railroad.

Tennessee Walking Horse National Celebration
The Tennessee Walking Horse National Celebration takes place each year during the 11 days and nights prior to Labor Day. It is the largest show for the Tennessee Walking Horse, during which the breed's World Grand Champion and over 20 World Champions are named. The Celebration is a festival event where more than $650,000 in prizes and awards are given. The Celebration began in 1939, and the first winner was Strolling Jim.

Education

K-12 education
Bedford County School District operates primary and secondary schools. Shelbyville Central High School is the local public high school.

After the end of non-penal slavery in the United States the AME Church opened a school for African-American children. The public school system graduated its first black class in 1890. The schools for African-American children operated by the district were East Bedford School and Bedford County Training School for Negroes (a.k.a. John McAdams High School and also Harris High School for Negroes). Schools racially integrated after 1964.

Higher education
The Tennessee College of Applied Technology - Shelbyville is one of 46 institutions in the Tennessee Board of Regents System, the seventh largest system of higher education in the nation. This system comprises six universities, fourteen community colleges, and twenty-six technology centers. More than 80 percent of all Tennessee students attending public institutions are enrolled in a Tennessee Board of Regents institution.

Local government

The City of Shelbyville, Tennessee Government consists of an elected mayor, six member elected city council, and appointed city manager.

Mayor – Randy Carroll
Council Members:
Henry Feldhaus
Marilyn Ewing
Gary Haile
William Christie
Stephanie Isaacs
Bobby Turnbow
City Manager – Scott Collins
City Recorder – Lisa Smith

Public media and news outlets
Shelbyville has one news media outlet, the Shelbyville Times-Gazette.

Notable people

Democratic Congressman Jim Cooper (born 1954). In Shelbyville, his family owns the historic River Side Farmhouse, built for his great-great-grandfather, Jacob Morton Shofner, in 1890, and the Gov. Prentice Cooper House in Shelbyville, built in 1904 for his grandfather, William Prentice Cooper, who served as the mayor of Shelbyville. His father, Prentice Cooper, who was born in the River Side Farmhouse, was the Governor of Tennessee from 1939 to 1945.
Robert Galbraith Allison (1897-1952), State of Tennessee budget department director.
Sumner Archibald Cunningham (1843-1913), founding editor of the Confederate Veteran, buried in Shelbyville's Willow Mount Cemetery.
Dickie Gardner, horse trainer
Joe Jenkins, Major League Baseball player
Harold A. Katz (1921-2012), Illinois state representative and lawyer
Sondra Locke (1944–2018), actress/director
Judy and Joe Martin, a married couple who trained horses together
Joyce Paul (1937–2016), country music singer
Samuel Escue Tillman (1847–1942), U.S. Army officer and superintendent of the United States Military Academy at West Point, New York

In popular culture

Shelbyville was featured in Miranda Lambert's video "Famous in a Small Town".

The city was also profiled in the film Welcome to Shelbyville, as part of the PBS documentary film series Independent Lens. The film spotlights recent demographic changes in the community, with a focus on the growing number of immigrants from Latin America and Somalia (both Somalis and people from the Bantu minority ethnic group).

Shelbyville was also featured in GADA film's Our Very Own (2005 Film), directed by Cameron Watson.  The film, dubbed "a love story to Shelbyville", highlighted some of the peculiar and humorous memories of Shelbyville in the 1970s. The film follows five teenagers who are determined to meet Shelbyville's own Sondra Locke.  Filmed in 2004, it highlights the square, Capri Theater, Pope's Cafe, Central High School, Duck River Dam, TWHNC, and many other landmarks.

Shelbyville was mentioned in the lyrics of Nashville country duo Birdcloud's song "Saving Myself For Jesus"

References

External links
 
 
 Shelbyville Mainstreet

 
Cities in Bedford County, Tennessee
Populated places established in 1810
Cities in Tennessee
County seats in Tennessee
1810 establishments in Tennessee